D.565 is a  long north–south state road running south from İğneada on the Black Sea to Izmir. The gap is connected by a car ferry operating between the two port cities. The route is mostly a four lane highway except for the first  section at its northern end.

In two separate sections, the D.565 runs concurrently with two other state roads in East Thrace: with the D.020 between Poyralı and Pınarhisar and with the D.100 between Lüleburgaz and Büyükkarıştıran.

Main intersections

East Thrace

Anatolia

References

External links

555
Transport in Kırklareli Province
Transport in Tekirdağ Province